Titanfall: Frontline is a cancelled card battle video game developed by American studio Particle City for Android and iOS devices, as part of the Titanfall franchise.

Gameplay 

Unlike other prominent collectible card games in the genre, which are played in turns, Titanfall: Frontline is played in real-time. The player collects and places Pilot, Titan, and burn cards to damage and defeat their opponent. Pilot and Titan cards can combine to perform extra damage.

The game is free-to-play, and players can choose to purchase in-game content.

Development 
In October 2015, Respawn Entertainment, creators of the Titanfall franchise, began a long-term partnership with Nexon, a company known for its free-to-play online games. The partnership was set to include Respawn sister studio and mobile game developer Particle City, which was co-founded by Respawn's Vince Zampella. Respawn owns a significant portion of Particle City, and Nexon invested in both Los Angeles-based companies as part of the deal. Several new franchise games are planned in the partnership, but none were expected to replicate the original's first-person shooter on a mobile device. Particle City led development on the title, and Nexon served as its publisher. It soft launched on Android in mid-September 2016 and on iOS in the Philippines later that month. Titanfall: Frontline was planned for a full release in 2016 on Android and iOS devices but was cancelled on January 13, 2017.

References

External links 
 

Cancelled Android (operating system) games
Cancelled iOS games
Free-to-play video games
Multiplayer video games
Nexon games
Digital collectible card games
Respawn Entertainment games
Titanfall
Video games developed in the United States